The Inland Gulf languages are a family of Trans–New Guinea languages in the classifications of Stephen Wurm (1975) and Malcolm Ross (2005). The unity of the languages was established by K. Franklin in 1969. Although the family as a whole is clearly valid, Ipiko is quite distinct from the other languages.

Languages
 Inland Gulf family
 Ipiko language
 Minanibai branch: Minanibai (Foia Foia), Mubami (Tao), Ukusi-Koparamio Hoia Hoia – Matakaia Hoia Hoia

Karami was once included, due to a large number of loanwords from Minanibai, but is best left unclassified for now.

Mahigi is also included by Pawley and Hammarström (2018).

Phonemes
Usher (2020) reconstructs the consonant inventory as follows:

{| 
| *m || *n ||  || 
|-
| *p || *t || || *k 
|-
| *b || *d || || *g
|-
| *ɸ || *s ||  ||  
|-
| *w || [*ɾ] || *j || *ɣ̃ 
|}
Vowels are *a *e *i *o *u.

Pronouns
The pronouns are:
{| 
! !!sg!!pl
|-
!1
|*no||*ni
|-
!2
|*ɣ̃o||*jo
|-
!3m
|*ete||rowspan=2|*eti
|-
!3f
|*etu
|}

Evolution
Inland Gulf reflexes of proto-Trans-New Guinea (pTNG) etyma:

Hoia Hoia, Mubami, Ipiko de ‘tree’ < *inda
Hoia Hoia mo’noto, Ipiko manoto ‘mouth’ < *maŋgat[a] ‘mouth, teeth’
Mubami mo’moʔo, Hoiahoia mo’mo:ko ‘seed’ < *maŋgV

References

External links 
 Timothy Usher, New Guinea World, Proto–Inland Gulf

 
Languages of Papua New Guinea
Anim languages